Gregory Oliver Diamond (May 4, 1949 – March 14, 1999) was an American pianist, drummer, songwriter, and producer who was active in the jazz and disco music scenes of the 1970s.

Career
Diamond was a member of the backing band for Jobriath, the Creatures. He played drums and percussion.

Diamond wrote the song "Hot Butterfly", which was released in 1978 under one of his group's names, Bionic Boogie, with Luther Vandross providing lead vocals. The song was later covered by David Lasley, the Sweet Inspirations, and Chaka Khan. His other popular songs included "Risky Changes" (released by Bionic Boogie in 1977), "Dance Little Dreamer" (released by Bionic Boogie in 1977), "Cream (Always Rises to the Top)" (released by Bionic Boogie in 1978), "Starcruisin'" (1978), "Fancy Dancer" (1978), and "Tiger, Tiger (Feel Good For a While)" (1979).

"Dance Little Dreamer" reached #1 on the Billboard Hot Dance Club Play chart in 1978. The song "Cream (Always Rises to the Top)" reached #61 in the UK Singles Chart in January 1979.

Diamond's association with Vandross came from the success of David Bowie's Young Americans album, which included contributions by both Vandross and Diamond's brother Godfrey (his sound engineer). He also wrote and produced an album for TK Records recording artist George McCrae, scoring a club hit with "Love in Motion". His biggest commercial success was as writer and producer of the single "More, More, More" recorded by the Andrea True Connection in 1975. Diamond received a posthumous songwriting credit for Len's 1999 hit "Steal My Sunshine", for it included a sample of "More, More, More".

Diamond died of gastrointestinal bleeding on March 14, 1999, at the age of 49.

Discography

Albums
 1977: Bionic Boogie (Polydor)
 1978: Gregg Diamond Bionic Boogie – Hot Butterfly (Polydor)
 1978: Gregg Diamond's Star Cruiser (TK)
 1979: Gregg Diamond Bionic Boogie – Tiger Tiger (Polydor)
 1979: Gregg Diamond Hardware (Mercury)

Singles

See also
List of artists who reached number one on the US Dance chart
List of disco artists (F-K)

References

External links

1949 births
1999 deaths
American dance musicians
American disco musicians
20th-century American male musicians
Deaths from gastrointestinal hemorrhage